Chapayevsk is a town in Samara Oblast, Russia, located  from the city of Samara, on the right bank of the Chapayevka River (a tributary of the Volga River). Population: 

It was previously known as Ivashchenkovo (until 1927), Trotsk (after Leon Trotsky until 1929).

History

The town's history dates back to 1909 when by Nicholas II's decree a military plant was established in the area. In 1929, the settlement was renamed Chapayevsk after the Red Army commander Vasily Chapayev. The town served as a base for secret military production, hosting four such factories until the dissolution of the Soviet Union in 1991.

On June 18, 2013, several strong explosions rocked the town and several villages around; 5,000 people were evacuated. According to Russian media, at least 34 people where injured in the explosions that originated in the town's ammunition storage facilities.

Administrative and municipal status
Within the framework of administrative divisions, it is, together with one rural locality, incorporated as the town of oblast significance of Chapayevsk—an administrative unit with the status equal to that of the districts. As a municipal division, the town of oblast significance of Chapayevsk is incorporated as Chapayevsk Urban Okrug.

Ecology
Chapayevsk is known as the "town of death" due to the high amount of toxins present in the environment. According to doctors, more than 80% of children suffer from chronic diseases. Since 1991, the birthrate in the city decreased by 40%. In the women's breast milk dioxin was found at 400 times above the normal level. In 1994, a special committee of the United Nations, after much research announced the town of Chapayevsk as an ecological disaster zone.

References

Notes

Sources

External links
Official website of Chapayevsk 
Chapayevsk Business Directory 

Cities and towns in Samara Oblast